This is the discography for Dutch jazz pop musician Trijntje Oosterhuis.

Albums

Compilations

Singles

References 

Discographies of Dutch artists
Jazz discographies
Pop music discographies